James Horn (5 February 1855 – 11 December 1932) was a Liberal Party Member of Parliament from Otago, New Zealand.

Biography

Early life
Horn was born in Inverkethney, Banffshire, Scotland and came to Otago in 1879. He was a storekeeper at Bannockburn, Otago from 1883 to 1928, when he moved to Dunedin.

Political career

He won the Wakatipu electorate in the 1919 general election, and held it to 1928, when he retired. In parliament he supported construction of the Otago Central Railway to Clyde and then Cromwell, and the breaking-up of large estates. A bridge on what is now  over the Clutha River at Albert Town opened in 1930 and was named James Horn Bridge.

From 1920 until 1925 he was the Liberal Party's junior whip.

Notes

References

1855 births
1932 deaths
New Zealand Liberal Party MPs
New Zealand people of Scottish descent
New Zealand businesspeople
Unsuccessful candidates in the 1911 New Zealand general election
People from Banffshire
People from Otago
New Zealand MPs for South Island electorates